Come Die My Love (Spanish: Manchas de sangre en la luna) is a 1952 British-Spanish drama film directed by Edward Dein and Luis Marquina and starring Honor Blackman, José Bódalo and Gérard Tichy. It was partly shot in Tangier in Spanish Morocco.

Cast
 Honor Blackman as Eva  
 José Bódalo as Eddie  
 Gérard Tichy as Bill  
 Francisco Viñals as padre Carmelo 
 Matilde Artero 
 Félix Fernández
 Manuel Guitián 
 Tony Hernández 
 Lolita Moreno 
 Miguel Pastor 
 Carmen Tarrazo

References

Bibliography
 de España, Rafael. Directory of Spanish and Portuguese film-makers and films. Greenwood Press, 1994.

External links

1952 films
British drama films
Spanish drama films
1952 drama films
1950s Spanish-language films
Films directed by Luis Marquina
Films scored by Jesús García Leoz
British black-and-white films
Spanish black-and-white films
1950s British films
1950s Spanish films